Kim Jung-min (born Kim Jung-soo on August 23, 1968) is a South Korean singer and actor.

Personal life
In 2006, Kim married former Japanese idol Rumiko Tani.

Discography

Studio album
 Kimjungmin (1994)"그대 사랑안에 머물러"
 4LOVE (1995)  "슬픈 언약식", "마지막 약속", "붐붐붐"
 Change (1996)  "애인", "무한지애", "굿바이 마이 프렌드"
 JUMP 98 (1998)
 The Greatest Love Song 2002 (2002)  "정상에서", "마지막 사랑" (러시아 내셔널 오케스트라 와 협연[1])
 2003 REBORN OF TIGER (2003)
 Beautiful My Life (2009)

Filmography

Television series
 Old Miss Diary (2004-2005)
 H.I.T (2007)
 Kokkiri (2008)
 Blossom Sisters (2010)
 Miss Ajumma (2011)
 12 Signs of Love (2012)
 Potato Star 2013QR3 (2013-2014)
 What Happens to My Family? (2014-2015)
Lady Cha Dal-rae's Lover (2018-2019)
 So Not Worth It (2021)

Film
Old Miss Diary (2006)
 Project Makeover (2006)

Variety shows
 King of Mask Singer (MBC, 2015): Contestant as "Asleep or Awake, Safety First" (Episodes 31–32)
 King of Mask Singer (MBC, 2020): Contestant as "Squid" (Episodes 261–262)
 Kim Jung-min's Morning Shouting (Naver, 2021) 
 Chosun Panstar  (MBN, 2021, judge) 
 Call me  (MBC Every1, 2021, Host)
 legendfestival (JTBC, 2022, Participant)

Music video appearances

References

External links

1968 births
Living people
South Korean male singers
South Korean singer-songwriters
South Korean male television actors
South Korean male film actors
South Korean male stage actors
Gwangsan Kim clan
South Korean male singer-songwriters